Point Lookout, Australia may refer to:

 Point Lookout, Queensland, a headland and coastal village
 Point Lookout Light, Australia, a lighthouse in Point Lookout, Queensland
 Point Lookout (New South Wales), a mountain

See also 
 Point Lookout (disambiguation)